The list of ship launches in 2002 includes a chronological list of all ships launched in 2002.


References

2002
Ship launches